The UK Chamber of Shipping is the trade association and voice of the UK shipping industry, representing around 200 member companies. They work with Government, parliament, international organisations and others to champion and protect the industry on behalf of their members. 

It is their mission to deliver for their members trusted specialist expertise, lobbying and influence at a UK level on maritime issues across national, European and international government and governmental bodies.

They are one of the principal members of the International Chamber of Shipping. Their headquarters are in Park Street, London. The Chamber promotes UK shipping around the world and often acts a source of maritime knowledge to the media. 

The body is also responsible for working closely with the UK government, Maritime UK and Maritime and Coastguard Agency. 

The official publisher of the UK Chamber of Shipping is Witherby Seamanship. The Merchant Navy Training Board is based at the UK Chamber's offices in London.

History
The Chamber has its origins in 1878 when a national trade body for shipping was formed. The Chamber was granted a Royal Charter in 1920 and went through several names, being known as the General Council of British Shipping until 1992 when its current name was adopted.

Presidents
1881: Edward Stock Hill
1899: Honourable James Cleland Burns, Cunard Line (later Baron Inverclyde)
1900: William James Pirrie, Chairman of Harland and Wolff (later Viscount Pirrie) 
1902: Colonel Robert Ropner, Ropner Shipping Company
2013: Helen Deeble.
2014: Kenneth MacLeod, Chairman of the British division of Stena Line
2016 Grahaeme Henderson.
2018 Sir Michael Bibby
2020 John Denholm

References

External links
Catalogue of the Chamber of Shipping archives, held at the Modern Records Centre, University of Warwick
 

British Merchant Navy
Organisations based in the London Borough of Southwark
Shipping trade associations